Octavian Calota-Popa (born November 22, 1984) is a Romanian basketball player which plays for CSM Ploiești of the Romanian Liga Națională and the Romanian national team.

He participated at the EuroBasket 2017.

References

1984 births
Living people
Point guards
Romanian men's basketball players
People from Mărășești